Gabe Nesbitt Stadium at Craig Ranch is a Baseball stadium located in Dallas Suburb McKinney, Texas. It was built to host playoff games for the University Interscholastic League and became Partial Home to National Pro Fastpitch team Dallas Charge.

References

Baseball venues in Texas
2005 establishments in Texas
Sports venues completed in 2005
Softball venues in Texas